Salvatore Giovanni Rinaldi (born 3 May 1937 in Cimitile) is a retired Italian Roman Catholic bishop.

Ordained to the priesthood in 1961, Rinaldi was named bishop of the Roman Catholic Diocese of Acerra, Italy in 2002 and retired on 18 September 2013.

References 

1937 births
Living people
People from the Province of Naples
Bishops in Campania